Kyrkos is a Greek surname. It is the surname of:
 Michail Kyrkos (1893–1967), Greek politician.
 Leonidas Kyrkos (1924–2011), Greek Resistance member, journalist and politician. 
 Miltos Kyrkos (born 1959), Greek chemical engineer and politician.

Greek-language surnames
Surnames